Songs For A Dead Pilot is a 1997 EP/mini-album by Duluth, Minnesota slowcore group Low, released in 1997. It was their first release on Kranky, and is viewed as their most minimalistic recording. The title is a reference to a pilot whose plane had crashed, whom the band read about. No credit is given for the cover artwork in the liner notes.

"Will The Night" is an early, ambient version of the song which later appeared in fuller form on Secret Name.

A recording of a concert on the late 1997 tour for this release was released as the live album, One More Reason to Forget.

Track listing
All songs by Low.

"Will The Night" (Lead vocals: inaudible vocals by Sparhawk) – 3:06
"Condescend" (Lead vocals: Mimi J. Parker) – 5:10
"Born By The Wires" (Lead vocals: Sparhawk) – 13:26
"Be There" (Lead vocals: Sparhawk, Parker) – 4:42
"Landlord" (Lead vocals: Sparhawk) – 6:47
"Hey Chicago" (Lead vocals: Sparhawk, Parker) – 2:40

Personnel
Alan Sparhawk - vocals, guitar, keyboards
Mimi Parker - percussion, vocals
Zak Sally - bass guitar
The Flag Day Strings - Jaron Childs (cello), Cassandra Legge (cello), Tresa Ellickson (viola)
Chris Freeman - keyboards on "Hey Chicago"
Bethany Legge - baby on "Condescend"

References

1997 EPs
Low (band) EPs
Kranky EPs